eCreamery is an ice cream, gelato and sorbet retailer. They are headquartered in Omaha, Nebraska, and have one parlor location at 5001 Underwood Avenue in the Dundee neighborhood. The company began selling online and shipping nationwide in 2008.

History 
In 2007 Becky App and Abby Jordan formed eCreamery Gourmet Ice Cream, Sorbet and Gelato in a small parlor in Omaha, Nebraska. Beginning in 2008, the pair started shipping their personalized ice cream offerings nationwide. In 2012, the company was featured on ABC's Shark Tank. Although a deal was not finalized, Barbara Corcoran indicated it was the best ice cream she had ever tasted and Mark Cuban said he loved the idea.

In 2014, eCreamery was featured in a famous photo of Sir Paul McCartney and Warren Buffett enjoying eCreamery ice cream on a bench outside the parlor. In 2015, the company outgrew production capabilities at the parlor and opened a shipping warehouse and commercial kitchen. All online orders are now shipped nationwide from this location, packed with dry ice in a reusable cooler.

In 2019, eCreamery merged with Carson's Cookie Fix of Omaha, Nebraska. Founded by Maddie Carson, the company specializes in custom, hand decorated cookies.  Ice cream and cookies are available on the eCreamery website.

Products 
eCreamery ice cream is made with a 14% butter fat content base to ensure a rich and dense finished product.  Each flavor is produced in a small batch process with all mix-ins and swirls added by hand. Pints also are filled by hand. Consumers have the ability to personalize the titles on the pints. eCreamery also offers ready-made collections for all major holidays and life events, such as Birthday, Get Well and Thinking of You.

Location and Distribution 
The parlor is located in Omaha, Nebraska in the Dundee neighborhood. eCreamery Ice Cream is also distributed throughout the Omaha metro area HyVee grocery stores, select Omaha restaurants, and area theaters. However, the bulk of eCreamery's business is conducted via their website. The ice cream flavors change quarterly and customers can create their own custom flavors with over 50 base flavors and 40 mix-in options available.

In Popular Culture 
eCreamery has been featured or mentioned on the television shows, Shark Tank, The Today Show  and Good Morning America. The company also has been featured or mentioned in print or online in Oprah, Martha Stewart Living, New York Times, ESPN, People, Vogue, Teen Vogue  and others.

Philanthropy 
eCreamery is active in local non-profit causes. Every month the parlor has a featured Scoops of Support flavor and for every pint sold, $1 is donated to the organization. There are also monthly events when a percentage of all sales also are donated. Donations are given to organizations such as Girls Rock, Big Brothers Big Sisters of the Midlands, Dundee Elementary, United Way and Joslyn Art Museum.

References

External links 
 eCreamery official website

Dairy products companies of the United States
Ice cream brands
Companies based in Omaha, Nebraska
Food and drink companies based in Nebraska